George Stuart may refer to:

 George Harold Stuart (1870–1951), British trade unionist
 George Okill Stuart Jr. (1807–1884), Quebec lawyer, judge and political figure
 George Okill Stuart (1776–1862), Anglican clergyman and educator
 George S. Stuart (born 1929), American sculptor, raconteur and historian
 George R. C. Stuart (1924–2008), American attorney and politician
 Lord George Stuart (1780–1841), Royal Navy officer
 George Stuart (classicist) (1715–1793), professor of humanities at the University of Edinburgh and joint founder of the Royal Society of Edinburgh
 George L. Stuart Jr., former state senator from Orlando

See also
George Steuart (disambiguation)
George Stewart (disambiguation)